The archaeological site of Delphi is an incredible source of information on Greek epigraphy. The most numerous single category of inscriptions are the manumission inscriptions, which reach roughly a number of 1300.

Acts of manumission
In antiquity, manumission was the act of freeing slaves by their owners. Slaves belonged to their masters until they served long enough or until they gathered the necessary sum of money for their liberation. When that moment came, the act of manumission had to be guaranteed by a god, most commonly Apollo. The slave was thus fictitiously sold to the deity, so that the sale action could never be violated. The act was recorded on inscriptions with a rather formulaic expression. The majority of the manumission inscriptions of Delphi are gathered in two main spots: on the supporting wall of the parodoi of the theatre and on the polygonal wall, particularly the part which served as back wall to the portico of the Athenians. Most of the inscriptions date between 200 B.C. and 100 A.D.

Manumission inscriptions as a source of information
Despite their stylized expressions, these inscriptions offer an insights into Greek social and demographic history. Over 60% of the manumission inscriptions of Delphi concern female slaves. A comparison of prices proves that most female slaves were manumitted at a price roughly 20% lower than men. However, it seems that liberation in many cases was not complete: slaves are required under a paramone clause to stay with their ex masters for a specific period of time or until the latter passed away. One wonders what kind of freedom this was, but it seems that in some cases this was considered better than nothing, as the master did not have complete rights of life and death over them; furthermore, there were cases in which the slaves had become almost members of the family, so they did not want to be separated from their social environment, yet they would rather have the choice. 
The manumission acts were usually attended by witnesses, whose names are also mentioned on the inscription. The other people mentioned are the priests of the temple of Apollo and thus manumission inscriptions constitute an excellent source for tracing the succession lists of the priesthood of Delphi.

The formula of a manumission inscription
A typical manumission inscription is that of the female slave Meda:

1   ἄρχο[ντος Ἀμφι]στ[ράτου]
μηνὸς [— — —]
κου, ἐπὶ τοῖσ[δε ἀπέδ]ο[τ]ο Τι-
μὼ Εὐδίκου, συνεπαινέοντος 
5   τοῦ υἱοῦ αὐτᾶς Λαδίκου, σῶμα γυ-
ναικεῖον κοράσιον ἇι ὄνομα Μήδα,
τιμᾶς ἀργυρίου δύο μνᾶν, καθὼς ἐπί-
στευσε Μήδα τῶι θεῶι τὰν ὠνάν, ἐφ’ ὧι-
τε ἐλευθέρα εἶμεν καὶ ἀνέφαπτος 
10   ἀπὸ πάντων τὸμ πάντα χρόνον, ποιοῦ-
σα ὅ κα θέληι. βεβαιωτὴρ κατὰ τοὺς
νόμους τᾶς πόλιος· Δρομοκλείδας. τρε-
φέτω δὲ Μήδα Σωσίβιον τὸν ἴδιον πατέ-
[ρ]α καὶ τὰμ ματέρα Σωσὼ καὶ εὐσχημο- 
15  νιζέτω, ἐπεί κα ἐν ἁλικίαν ἔλθη, εἰ χρείαν ἔ-
χοισαν Σωσίβιος ἢ Σωσὼ τροφᾶς ἢ εὐσχημονι-
σμοῦ, εἴτε δουλεύοντες εἶεν εἴτε ἐλεύθεροι
γεγονότες· εἰ δὲ μὴ τρέφοι ἢ μὴ εὐσχημονίζοι Μήδα
Σωσίβιον ἢ Σωσὼ χρείαν ἔχοντας, ἐξουσία ἔστω 
20   Σωσιβίωι καὶ Σωσοῖ κολάζειν Μήδαν ὧ[ι] θέλοιν
τρόπωι, καὶ ἄ[λλ]ωι ὑπὲρ Σωσίβιον ἢ Σωσὼ ὅγ κα κε-
λεύη Σωσίβιος ἢ Σωσώ. εἰ δέ τις ἐφάπτοιτο Μήδας
ἐπὶ καταδουλισμῶι, βέβαιον παρεχόντω τῶι
θεῶι τὰν ὠνὰν ἅ τε ἀποδομένα Τιμὼ καὶ ὁ βεβαι- 
25   ωτὴρ Δρομοκλείδας· εἰ δὲ μὴ παρέχοισαν, πράκτιμοι
ἔστων Μήδαι καὶ Σωσιβίωι καὶ Σωσοῖ ἀργυρίου μνᾶν
{μ[ν]ᾶν} τεσσάρων κατὰ τὸν νόμον ἅ τε ἀποδομένα καὶ
ὁ βεβαιω[τ]ήρ. ὁμοίως δὲ καὶ ὁ παρατυχὼν κύριος ἔστω
Μήδαν σ[υλ]έων ὡς ἐλευθέραν ἀνυπόδικος ἐὼν καὶ ἀ- 
30   ζάμιος πάσας δίκας καὶ ζαμίας, καθώς κα συλάση ἐπ’ ἐ-
λευθερίαι. μάρτυρες· οἱ ἱερεῖς τοῦ Ἀπόλλωνος Ἀμύντας
καὶ τῶν ἀρχόντων Ἄσανδρος, ἰδιῶται Μένης, Εὐκλῆς Ἐτυ-
μώνδα, Μεσατεύς, Ἄρχων Καλλία, Ἄθαμβος Ἀγάθω-
νος, Τυρβαῖος. 

It is interesting to notice that the slave is mentioned in all manumission inscriptions as " σῶμα" (body). Meda appears to be a young girl, who is manumitted at a price of two silver minas, i.e. at the lowest level. Her obligation is to take care of her parents until she becomes an adult; a possible explanation is that the parents paid for her manumission. Both parents appear to be slaves as well. 

A careful examination of the names and place of origin of those who liberated their slaves proves that the "trend" of liberating slaves in Delphi came with the advent of the Aetolians. The majority of masters were of Aetolian origin at least in the first century. However, the trend soon spread and the next two largest categories are, naturally, Locrians and Phocians, who lived nearby.

Bibliography
Austin, M., "The Hellenistic World from Alexander to the Roman Conquest"
Tucker, C.W., 1982,"Women in the Manumission Inscriptions at Delphi", Transactions of the American Philologic Association
Sosin,J.D. "Manumission with Paramone: Conditional Freedom?" , TAPA 
Bechtel, J., 1878, Sammlung Griechischer DialektInschriften, Berlin
Andreau, J. and Descat, R., 2011 [2006]. The Slave in Greece and Rome, translated by Marion Leopold. Madison, WI. 
Bloch, M. 1914. Die Freilassungsbedingungen der delphischen Freilassungsinschriften. Diss. Straßburg.
Duncan-Jones, R. P. 1984. “Problems of the Delphic Manumission Payments 200–1 BC.” ZPE 57: 203–9. 
Fisher, N. R. E. 2001 [1993]. Slavery in Classical Greece. London. 
Garlan, Y., 1988 [1982]. Slavery in Ancient Greece, translated by Janet Lloyd. Ithaca, NY.

References

External links

Delphi
Slavery and religion
Greek inscriptions
Archaeological discoveries in Greece